The 1893–94 season was the first season in which football club New Brompton F.C. (later renamed Gillingham F.C.) competed.  The club did not play in a league, but played a large number of friendlies and matches in local cup competitions as well as taking part in the qualifying rounds of the FA Cup and FA Amateur Cup.

Friendlies
New Brompton's first ever match was at home to the reserves of Woolwich Arsenal on 2 September 1893, a match which the away team won 5–1.

FA Cup
New Brompton entered at the first qualifying round stage, but lost 6–3 away to Ilford.  A.Jenner scored two goals and D.Hutcheson the third.

FA Amateur Cup
New Brompton beat Maidstone United and Royal Scots Fusiliers before losing 1–2 to Royal Ordnance.

Kent Senior Cup
New Brompton were eliminated by Dartford.

Chatham Charity Cup
New Brompton won this minor local competition, beating Sheppey United 3–1 in the final on 14 April.

References

1893-94
English football clubs 1893–94 season